Isha Basant Joshi (born Isha Basant Mukand; 31 December 1908, date of death unknown) was an Indian Administrative Service officer and author. She published books under the name of Esha Joshi. She was the first Indian to be accepted into the "Bastion of the British" school of La Martiniere Girls High School in Lucknow, India. She was the first woman Indian Administrative Services officer of British India.

Early life and education
Joshi was born on 31 December 1908. After attending the La Martinere Girls High School, Lucknow, She went to Isabella Thoburn College and the Lucknow University, where she gained her Master of Arts. She undertook higher studies in Britain and then became a part of the Indian Administrative Services.

Career
The first woman IAS officer of Independent India, Joshi was posted as Magistrate and then as Assistant Commissioner in Delhi. She held senior and honorable positions in various departments and became the Commissioner-cum-State-Editor of the District Gazette. She then served in senior roles in the Ministry of Education. She edited a magazine before retiring from service in 1966. Joshi started her next phase of career as an author after her service as a civil servant of India. She published a number of books under the name of Esha Joshi.

Personal life 
In 2004, it was reported that Joshi, who at that time was a 96-year-old widow, was being looked after by distant relatives in the servant quarters of a mansion on Kabir Marg in Lucknow. Following media reports, she was taken inside.

Major works 
 The Jewel in the Case and other stories,  
 Spindrift: Poems, 1994, Writers Workshop 
 Sanctuary, poems, 1987

References

1908 births
Year of death missing
La Martinière College, Lucknow alumni
Indian women short story writers
20th-century Indian women writers
Indian civil servants
Writers from Lucknow
University of Lucknow alumni
Indian women editors
Indian editors
Indian magazine editors
20th-century Indian poets
20th-century Indian short story writers
Women writers from Uttar Pradesh
Indian women poets
Women magazine editors